The Best of Nancy Wilson is the first compilation album by American singer Nancy Wilson. All of the selections were previously released as album tracks or singles between 1960 and 1968. The only track to appear for the first time on an album was the single version of "Face it Girl, it's Over," which is a longer edit than the version found on the LP Easy.

Ron Wynn at AllMusic calls the album "a reasonable sampler." He notes that while "it's impossible to fully convey the depth of her career from one album, this set at least didn't skimp on the jazz and blues numbers that earned her her reputation."

The album spent 14 weeks on the Billboard charts, reaching No. 23 on the Hot R&B LPs and No. 145 on the Billboard 200.

Track listing

Personnel 
 Nancy Wilson – vocals
 Oliver Nelson – arranger, conductor (1–2,4,8)
 Jimmy Jones – arranger, conductor (3,9–10)
 Billy May – arranger, conductor (5)
 H. B. Barnum – arranger, conductor (6)
 Sid Feller – arranger, conductor (7)
 David Cavanaugh – producer

References 

1968 compilation albums
Nancy Wilson (jazz singer) albums
Vocal jazz compilation albums